Sex Drive is a 2008 American road comedy film about a high school graduate who goes on a road trip to have sex with a girl he met online. It is based on the young adult novel All the Way by American author Andy Behrens. The film was directed by Sean Anders, and stars Josh Zuckerman, Amanda Crew, Clark Duke, Seth Green, and James Marsden, while Katrina Bowden, Alice Greczyn, Michael Cudlitz, Dave Sheridan, and David Koechner appear in supporting roles. It was released in North America on October 17, 2008, and in the United Kingdom on January 9, 2009. The film received mixed reviews, with the performances of Duke, Marsden, and Green receiving praise.

Plot
Ian Lafferty is an 18-year-old recent high school graduate. He searches for a girl online making it seem as if he is attractive and strong, although he is sweet and unassuming. He soon meets "Ms. Tasty" and agrees to meet her in person. She lives in Knoxville, Tennessee, while he lives in Bartlett, Illinois. With his best friends Lance Nesbitt and Felicia Alpine, he goes to Knoxville in a 1969 Pontiac GTO Judge borrowed without permission from Ian's arrogant, homophobic and macho older brother Rex.

On the way to Knoxville, they come across a hitchhiker, as the radiator in the Judge overheats. They attempt urinating in the radiator, which only works briefly as they try to leave the hitchhiker in the dust. The hitchhiker, frustrated at Ian's lack of concern for his well-being, leaves, but not before urinating on the car window. As Ian and Felicia wander to find help, Lance is waiting with the car as Ezekiel happens to pass by in his horse-drawn buggy. Ezekiel and his Amish buddies repair the car while they join a Rumspringa party where Fall Out Boy are playing a concert, and at which Lance meets an attractive Amish girl named Mary. The three promise to come again on the way back to do some work in return for fixing the car.

They go to jail due to Ian throwing a tire iron into a state trooper car, due to his increasing frustration after trying to put a possum he hit out of its misery, and are released after Mary pays the bail. Upon arriving in Knoxville, they find a hotel that sports a wide variety of role playing rooms. Rex, who has discovered the Judge missing, arrives angrily and insists that they go back and that Ian cannot visit Ms. Tasty. After Ian pretends to be gay, Rex allows him to see Ms. Tasty, hoping this encounter will change Ian's mind. Ian finally meets Ms. Tasty. However, when he tells her about Felicia, her seduction of Ian becomes a threat as her psychotic boyfriend Bobby Jo puts a gun to Ian's head. It becomes apparent that they work at a chop shop and attempt to steal the Judge.

Lance and Mary arrive after having sex, as well as a redneck named Rick, whose girlfriend Brandy slept with Lance earlier. Felicia, however, is hiding in the car when Bobby Jo tries to steal it. Soon, a green car that has been continuously drag-racing with the Judge throughout the movie arrives. Ian manages to save Felicia, who then is able to run off and report to the police. Ms. Tasty tries to escape, but is stopped by the green car, whose drivers turn out to be Andy and Randy, two dim-witted self-declared "womanizers" from Ian's school, whom Ms. Tasty tried to manipulate into giving her the car. Bobby Jo is treated after being shot by Ian in self-defense. Felicia tells the police about the chop shop location and the couple is arrested.

Upon finding out that if Mary leaves the Amish community, she will be shunned, Lance refuses to come back home and stays behind to marry Mary, while Ian and Felicia realize their love for each other. Ian and Felicia drive to a tree where Ian throws his shoes up into the tree. A few weeks later Ian is Felicia's date to her cousin's wedding. At Thanksgiving dinner, Rex tells his family that he is gay. On New Year's Eve, Ian and Felicia have sex, in Ian's basement on the couch under a blanket. In the final frame of the film, a picture is shown of Lance and Mary getting married, accompanied by Ian. Lance is shown sporting a beard exactly like Ezekiel's. During the credits, a short scene shows Ezekiel and Fall Out Boy arguing over the fact that the Amish fixed Fall Out Boy's tour bus for just "a five song set" in form for compensation, referring to a running gag throughout the movie.

Cast

Soundtrack
 "Porcupine Jacket" by Tramps & Thieves
 "Time to Pretend" by MGMT
 "Fa-Fa-Fa" by Datarock
 "Let's Ride" by Airbourne
 "Bang Bang to the Rock n Roll" by Gabin
 The band Fall Out Boy also makes a cameo within the film, playing "Fame < Infamy", as well as, "Grand Theft Autumn/Where Is Your Boy Tonight (Acoustic)"
 "Life Is Beautiful" by Vega4
 "Let's Get It Up" by AC/DC
 "Message from Yuz" by Switches
 "Danger Zone" by Kenny Loggins
 The film also features songs from Donovan, Jem, Hot Hot Heat, Switches, Pornosonic and Nitty.
 "Got You (Where I Want You)" by The Flys
 "I Don't Care" End credits by Fall Out Boy
 "You Love Me" by Teddy Tala

Reception

Box office
Sex Drive grossed $3.6 million opening weekend, finishing in 9th place. It went on to gross $8.4 million in the United States and $10.4 million in other countries, for a total gross of $18.8 million, against its $19 million budget. It made a further $10 million in home media sales.

Critical response
On review aggregator Rotten Tomatoes, the film has an approval rating of 45% based on 110 reviews, with an average rating of 5.23/10. The site's critical consensus reads, "Sex Drive has some hilarious moments and is well made for a raunchy teen film, but will appeal to few beyond that demographic." On Metacritic the film has a weighted average score of 49 out of 100, based on reviews from 24 critics, indicating "mixed or average reviews".

Owen Gleiberman writing for Entertainment Weekly gave the film a grade B−, and suggests the appealing lead actors deserve a better movie, and particularly praises Seth Green for his performance. Kyle Smith of the New York Post praises the performance of Clark Duke. Smith complains that the "gags aren’t edited so much as slammed together" but that "there are interesting characters [...] and a disarming innocence" drawing an analogy between writer-director Sean Anders and John Hughes. Cammila Albertson writing for TV Guide says it's good for its genre, "funny, it's lewd, and it's actually kind of creative" and although it isn't art it makes the effort to include plenty of extra crazy, random bits. Albertson concludes "all that matters is if it's funny -- and it is." and gives the film 3 out of 4 stars.

Roger Ebert gave it 2 out of 4 stars, and wrote that although the film contained "some laughs [...] it is so raunchy and driven by its formula that you want to cringe".
Nathan Rabin of the AV Club called it affably mediocre, and "a limp variation on a hoary old teen-film trope".

Home media
The film was released on two-disc DVD and Blu-ray Disc February 24, 2009, both featuring the rated and unrated cuts of the film. Preceding the unrated cut, an intro by director Anders and some members of the cast explaining that the unrated cut is a "fan's cut" and to watch the original theatrical cut before viewing the unrated version. The cut features an additional 20 minutes of footage, including more profanity (about 20 additional uses of the word "fuck"), and both male and female full frontal nudity.

References

External links

 
 

2008 films
2008 LGBT-related films
2008 romantic comedy films
2000s comedy road movies
2000s road movies
2000s coming-of-age comedy films
2000s teen sex comedy films
2000s teen romance films
American comedy road movies
American coming-of-age comedy films
American romantic comedy films
American sex comedy films
American teen comedy films
American teen LGBT-related films
American teen romance films
Alloy Entertainment films
Amish in films
Coming-of-age romance films
Films about brothers
Films about dysfunctional families
Films about virginity
Films based on American novels
Films based on young adult literature
Films directed by Sean Anders
Films produced by John Morris
Films scored by Stephen Trask
Films set in Chicago
Films set in Indiana
Films set in Kentucky
Films set in Tennessee
Films shot in Florida
Films with screenplays by John Morris
Films with screenplays by Sean Anders
LGBT-related coming-of-age films
LGBT-related romantic comedy films
LGBT-related sex comedy films
2000s English-language films
2000s American films